Abdollahabad (also Romanized as ʿAbdollahābād) is a village in Senderk Rural District, Senderk District, Minab County, Hormozgan Province, Iran. At the 2006 census, its population was 335, in 65 families.

References 

Populated places in Minab County